Paul Stehrenberger (born 14 September 1938) is a retired Swiss football defender and later manager.

References

1938 births
Living people
Swiss men's footballers
FC Luzern players
Grasshopper Club Zürich players
FC Wettingen players
Association football defenders
Swiss football managers
FC Aarau managers
FC Wettingen managers
Switzerland international footballers